Ilektra Lebl (born 12 February 1999) is a Greek swimmer. She competed in the women's 200 metre individual medley event at the 2017 World Aquatics Championships.

References

1999 births
Living people
Greek female swimmers
Swimmers at the 2018 Mediterranean Games
Place of birth missing (living people)
Swimmers at the 2015 European Games
European Games medalists in swimming
European Games bronze medalists for Greece
Greek female medley swimmers
Mediterranean Games competitors for Greece